Santiago Zacatepec  is a town and municipality in Oaxaca in south-western Mexico. 
It is part of the Sierra Mixe district within the Sierra Norte de Oaxaca Region.
The Spanish municipality was founded around 1520.

The municipality covers an area of 142.89 km² of mountainous and wooded terrain. The town is at an elevation of 1,200 above sea level.
The climate is mild with most rain between from June and January.
Flora include oak, cedar, sapodilla, mahogany and chokecherry.
Wild fauna include deer, skunk, rabbit, squirrel, badger, wild boar, wild cat, mountain lion, mole, mountain lion, monkey, armadillo, fox, raccoon and opossum. 

As of 2005, the municipality had 1,106 households with a total population of 4.871 of whom 4,378 people spoke an indigenous language. Most of the people are engaged in agriculture, growing corn, beans and fruits.
There is some production of mezcal.

References

Municipalities of Oaxaca